The 2023–24 UEFA Women's Nations League will be the inaugural season of the UEFA Women's Nations League, an international women's football competition contested by the senior women's national teams of the member associations of UEFA. The results will be used to determine the leagues for the UEFA Women's Euro 2025 qualifying competition.

Format
The competition will begin with the league stage, featuring the national teams split into three leagues (A, B and C) based on the UEFA coefficient ranking. Leagues A and B will feature 16 teams in four groups of four teams, while League C will consist of the remaining competition entrants split into groups of three or four teams.

The teams in each group will play against each other home-and-away in a round-robin format. The four group winners of League A will advance to the Nations League Finals, which will feature single-leg semi-finals, a third place play-off and final. The home teams of the matches will be decided by means of a draw. The top two teams in the Nations League Finals (excluding France) will qualify for the Women's Olympic Football Tournament.

In addition, the competition will feature promotion and relegation, taking effect in UEFA Women's Euro 2025 qualifying (which will use an identical league structure). The group winners of Leagues B and C will be automatically promoted, while the fourth-placed teams in Leagues A and B, as well as the lowest-ranked third-placed team in League B (conditional upon the number of entrants), will be automatically relegated. Promotion and relegation matches will also be held on a home-and-away basis, taking place in parallel with the Nations League Finals, with the winners going into the higher league and the losers going into the lower league. The third-placed teams of League A will play the runners-up of League B, while the three best-ranked third-placed teams in League B will play the three best-ranked League C runners-up (conditional upon the number of entrants). The teams from the higher leagues will be seeded, and play the second leg at home. In the two-legged ties, the team that scores more goals on aggregate is the winner. If the aggregate score is level, extra time is played (the away goals rule is not applied). If the score remains level after extra time, a penalty shoot-out is used to decide the winner.

Tiebreakers for group ranking
If two or more teams in the same group are equal on points on completion of the league phase, the following tie-breaking criteria are applied:
 Higher number of points obtained in the matches played among the teams in question;
 Superior goal difference in matches played among the teams in question;
 Higher number of goals scored in the matches played among the teams in question;
 If, after having applied criteria 1 to 3, teams still have an equal ranking, criteria 1 to 3 are reapplied exclusively to the matches between the teams in question to determine their final rankings. If this procedure does not lead to a decision, criteria 5 to 11 apply;
 Superior goal difference in all group matches;
 Higher number of goals scored in all group matches;
 Higher number of away goals scored in all group matches;
 Higher number of wins in all group matches;
 Higher number of away wins in all group matches;
 Lower disciplinary points total in all group matches (1 point for a single yellow card, 3 points for a red card as a consequence of two yellow cards, 3 points for a direct red card, 4 points for a yellow card followed by a direct red card).
 Position in the UEFA women's national team coefficient ranking.
Notes

Criteria for league ranking
Individual league rankings are established according to the following criteria:
 Position in the group;
 Higher number of points;
 Superior goal difference;
 Higher number of goals scored;
 Higher number of goals scored away from home;
 Higher number of wins;
 Higher number of wins away from home;
 Lower disciplinary points total (1 point for a single yellow card, 3 points for a red card as a consequence of two yellow cards, 3 points for a direct red card, 4 points for a yellow card followed by a direct red card).
 Position in the UEFA women's national team coefficient ranking.

In order to rank teams in League C, which may be composed of different sized groups, the results against the fourth-placed teams in these leagues are not taken into account for the purposes of comparing teams placed first, second and third in their respective groups.

The ranking of the top four teams in League A are determined by their finish in the Nations League Finals.

Criteria for overall ranking
The overall UEFA Nations League rankings are established as follows:
 The 16 League A teams are ranked 1st to 16th according to their league rankings.
 The 16 League B teams are ranked 17th to 32nd according to their league rankings.
 The League C teams are ranked 33rd onwards according to their league rankings.

Schedule
The competition will be played from September 2023 to the northern spring 2024. It will begin with the league phase, and end with the Nations League Finals and promotion and relegation matches played in parallel. Below is the schedule of the 2023–24 UEFA Women's Nations League.

Teams and draw
All 55 UEFA national teams are able to submit an entry for the competition by 23 March 2023 at the latest, which also acts as entry for UEFA Women's Euro 2025 qualifying. With this in mind, Russia are currently suspended indefinitely from UEFA and FIFA competitions due to the country's invasion of Ukraine.

Further to this, Gibraltar and Liechtenstein have not yet entered a UEFA or FIFA competition, while San Marino does not have a women's national team.

The draw for the league phase will take place on 2 May 2023, 13:00 CEST, at the House of European Football in Nyon, Switzerland. Teams will be split into leagues based on their UEFA women's national team coefficient ranking.

Notes

League A

Group A1

Group A2

Group A3

Group A4

Nations League Finals

The pairings and home teams will be determined by means of an open draw on 11 December 2023.

Bracket

Semi-finals

Third place play-off

Final

League B

Group B1

Group B2

Group B3

Group B4

Ranking of third-placed teams

League C

Group C1

Group C2

Group C3

Group C4

Group C5

Ranking of second-placed teams

Promotion and relegation matches
The promotion and relegation match pairings will be determined by means of a draw on 11 December 2023.

League A vs League B

|}

League B vs League C

|}

References

Nations League
September 2023 sports events in Europe
October 2023 sports events in Europe
November 2023 sports events in Europe
December 2023 sports events in Europe